TIA1 or Tia1 cytotoxic granule-associated rna binding protein is a 3'UTR mRNA binding protein that can bind the 5'TOP sequence of 5'TOP mRNAs.  It is associated with programmed cell death (apoptosis) and regulates alternative splicing of the gene encoding the Fas receptor, an apoptosis-promoting protein. Under stress conditions, TIA1 localizes to cellular RNA-protein conglomerations called stress granules. It is encoded by the TIA1 gene.

Mutations in the TIA1 gene have been associated with amyotrophic lateral sclerosis, frontotemporal dementia, and Welander distal myopathy. It also plays a crucial role in the development of toxic oligomeric tau in Alzheimer's disease.

Function 
This protein is a member of a RNA-binding protein family that regulates transcription and RNA translation. It was first identified in cytotoxic lymphocyte (CTL) target cells. TIA1 acts in the nucleus to regulate splicing and transcription. TIA1 helps to recruit the splicesome to regulate RNA splicing, and it inhibits transcription of multiple genes, such as the cytokine Tumor necrosis factor alpha. In response to stress, TIA1 translocates from the nucleus to the cytoplasm, where it nucleates a type of RNA granule, termed the stress granule, and participates in the translational stress response.  As part of the translational stress response, TIA1 works in cooperation with other RNA binding proteins to sequester RNA transcripts away from the ribosome, which allows the cell to focus its protein synthesis/RNA translation machinery on producing proteins that will address the particular stress. It has been suggested that this protein may be involved in the induction of apoptosis as it preferentially recognizes poly(A) homopolymers and induces DNA fragmentation in CTL targets. The major granule-associated species is a 15-kDa protein that is thought to be derived from the carboxyl terminus of the 40-kDa product by proteolytic processing. Alternative splicing resulting in different isoforms of this gene product have been described.

See also 
 Stress granule
 T-cell large granular lymphocyte leukemia

References

Further reading

External links